Goochland County Court Square is a historic county courthouse and national historic district located at Goochland, Goochland County, Virginia.  It includes three contributing buildings and one contributing site.  The Goochland County Court House was built in 1826 by Dabney Cosby, an architect of the area. It is a two-story, temple-form brick structure with a projecting pedimented tetrastyle Tuscan order portico.  

Other buildings in the square include the 1848 two-story, hipped-roof stone jail; the original one-story, brick clerk's office; and a monument to the Confederate dead of Goochland County. The latter was erected in the late 19th or early 20th century.

The historic district was listed on the National Register of Historic Places in 1970.

References

External links
Goochland County Courthouse, East Side of U.S. Route 522, Goochland, Goochland County, VA: 4 photos, 1 color transparency, and 2 photo caption pages at Historic American Buildings Survey

Historic American Buildings Survey in Virginia
Courthouses on the National Register of Historic Places in Virginia
Historic districts on the National Register of Historic Places in Virginia
Government buildings completed in 1826
County courthouses in Virginia
Buildings and structures in Goochland County, Virginia
National Register of Historic Places in Goochland County, Virginia
1826 establishments in Virginia